Argentine rock (known locally as rock nacional , "national rock" in the sense of "local", "not international") is rock music composed or performed by Argentine bands or artists mostly in Spanish.

Argentine rock began by recycling hits of English-language rock & roll. However a rising trend of composing new songs mostly in Spanish can be traced at late 1960s, when several garage groups and aspiring musicians began composing songs and lyrics that related to local social and musical topics. Since then, Argentine rock started a continued and uninterrupted evolution through the 1970s and into the 1980s.

A distinguishing trait of Argentine rock is its insistence on Spanish language lyrics. Argentine rock today is a blanket term describing a number of rock styles and sub-cultures within Argentina.

Related genre
Several terms are used to describe the artistic expressions of rock and roll in Iberian America, which are often confused or given different meanings in different countries. Generally, these terms are:
Rock en Español: includes all rock sung in Spanish.
Latin Rock: includes all expressions of rock and roll in Latin American countries, the Caribbean, and the Latin American community of the United States. In addition to rock sung in Spanish, this includes rock sung in English, Portuguese, French, and other Latin-based languages. This generally refers to a cultural movement that began in the 80's throughout Latin America.
Rock Nacional in Argentina: refers to a movement of progressive music that rapidly gained popularity in 1967 with the song "La Balsa".
Argentine rock: refers to all expressions of rock performed in Argentina, regardless of language and subgenre.

1958−1964: Early rock and roll 

Rock and roll first began to appear in Argentina in 1956 after the genre was created in the United States in 1954-1955, based largely on rhythm and blues and country and western. Elvis Presley and Bill Haley (who visited Argentina in 1958) awakened the interest of several Argentine artists. The most notable among Argentine garage bands which sprung up in this period was Sandro y Los de Fuego, who recorded a successful series of Spanish language covers of American rock and roll hits, and attained commercial popularity. Sandro would soon embark on his own contemporary pop standards career that would make him popular. Others include Eddie Pequenino, Los Cinco Latinos and Billy Cafaro.

1964−1975: The classic period
The first few years of rock music in Argentina were confined to cover bands. In 1964, Argentina, like much of the rest of the world, was shaken by The Beatles phenomenon.

Historians describe a parallel pattern of development with the United States in certain aspects of culture. Both countries were the destination for millions of Europeans, and their musical heritage were heavily influenced by Pan-European folk and traditional marches. These similar musical infusions yielded related results in both: a grass-roots rural guitar-based musical tradition, becoming Bluegrass and Country in the US, in Argentina Folklore and Pampas music. Country music is an important pillar of Rock & Roll. In Argentina folklore (at that time Nueva canción was sweeping Argentina), was increasingly crossing over to popular musical trends by the late 1950s.

Late 60s beat music

By 1965, rock music was developing rapidly in Argentina. On television, several shows such as Ritmo y Juventud and El Club del Clan, with singers like Palito Ortega, Violeta Rivas, Chico Navarro, and Lalo Fransen, featured a poppy version of rock, which owed equal amounts to Merseybeat and to Argentine and Italian romantic pop.

Nevertheless, it was in the underground where the most influential figures of early Argentine rock would emerge. In former Jazz bars like "La Cueva" or "La Perla del Once", figures like Moris, Pajarito Zaguri, Javier Martinez (drummer and lead singer in the Argentine blues band Manal) Miguel Abuelo, and Tanguito would gather in the  mid-1960s Argentina to exchange ideas. Los Beatnicks, of which Moris and Martinez where members, began the transition that would slowly take Argentine rock from imitation to a more creative state (while still following UK trends mainly). Forming in quiet beaches of Villa Gesell, they recorded the first Spanish language single in 1966 called "Rebelde".

The definitive breakthrough of Spanish-language, original material rock would be up to the band Los Gatos. After playing in "La Cueva" for a few months, the band released two singles in 1967. One of them, "La Balsa", co-written by Tanguito and Litto Nebbia, sold 200,000 copies. This contributed to the widespread popularity of the genre because it was in Spanish and it was an original composition. The following year saw the first publication of Pinap, a rock magazine, and the founding of the first Argentine rock label, Mandioca. In 1969, four major concerts of so-called "música beat" ("beat music") were held: the June Sunday concerts, Festival Nacional de Música Beat, Festival Pinap and Festival de Música Joven.

In the wake of Los Gatos, several bands emerged, including Luis Alberto Spinetta's Almendra, and Manal. The three are considered the founders of the Argentine rock movement. None of these groups would have an extended history: in fact most disbanded by the early 1970s. The early Argentine rock scene was characterised by a lot of line-up changes in bands, and even member swapping between bands, or members of different bands meeting and forming new groups. However, the shuffles provided for a lot of experimentation and creativity.

Almendra split in 1970 and Spinetta formed Pescado Rabioso, and the remaining members started Color Humano and Aquelarre. Spinetta's album Artaud was considered the greatest Argentine rock album of all time by the Rolling Stone Magazine. In 1970, Vox Dei refreshed the movement. Their album "La Biblia" (The Bible) is one of their most famous works of the early 1970s. In that same year, the first B.A (Buenos Aires) Rock festival became the first showcase of a rising subgenre that would predominate the first half of 1970s Argentine rock. A new group of musicians was to bring new ideas to the mixing bowl of early Argentine rock.

Acoustic and heavy rock

By the turn of the decade the first real diversification in Argentine rock start taking place, although the split had been brewing even before, as some bands began playing much heavier music, with the world of rock entering the Heavy metal era. Among them, Pescado Rabioso, Vox Dei, and Billy Bond y La Pesada del Rock. Pappo's Blues was acknowledged as one of the greatest guitarist of all time by B.B King, who invited him to play in the Madison Square Garden. Another important but overlooked heavy rock act of the period is El Reloj, but they would drift towards progressive rock in the following years.

Conversely, the first B.A Rock festival (now promoted by Pinap magazine successor Revista Pelo), had many of the artists and bands that would lead the Acoustic rock movement: Gustavo Santaolalla forming Arco Iris, León Gieco's folk-rock hybrid, Sui Generis and the start of Charly García's music career, Raul Porchetto, and Pedro y Pablo, among other bands.

The proliferation of these bands and their increasing popularity, the early 1970s being the height of the hippie movement in Argentina, led to the Acusticazo of 1972. Several acoustic rock bands would gain popularity from their performances there, including Vivencia, Pastoral, and Alma y Vida. The behemothic success of the Acusticazo was a turning point in which Argentine began to be listened massively.

That same year, Tanguito was killed hit by a train. Conspiracies about his death abound, including that he committed suicide and even that he was thrown onto the tracks by police. As he was a heavy drug user, others contend he simply might have tripped. The 1993 motion picture Tango Feroz ("Wild Tango") tells the life of Tanguito.

As the 1970s progressed, acoustic rock continued as the most popular style in the country.

Sui Generis farewell concerts

Sui Generis began shifting from their classic acoustic rock to a more electric and visceral sound. Also, stirring in the Argentine underground were new bands with a radically different sound from either acoustic or heavy rock: influenced by some of acoustic rock's more experimental works (such as Arco Iris and their Agitor Lucens V with its world music influences), by Tango music and also by British progressive rock. This would be the blueprint of Argentine progressive rock that would bloom into the apex of the movement in 1975. As that year began few could foresee what a watershed it would become not just in Argentine rock history, but the country's too.

Charly García and Nito Mestre decided it was time to leave Sui Generis. Their two final concerts took place at the Luna Park Arena, on September 5 of 1975, in front of 30,000 people. Historians have come to see the Sui Generis farewell concerts as the end of the 'Classic' Argentine rock era. Acoustic rock was passing into history: bands dissolved, changed their sound, and those that remained lost popularity and became only cult followings. Argentine progressive rock was on the rise, and so was the political repression to freedoms of expression. Also, several bands would leave the country for greener pastures in Europe, mostly Spain, among them Moris and Aquelarre.

The Classic era of Argentine rock music was completely over by 1976. As this year began, Argentine rock became far more sophisticated and conceptual. A few acoustic bands would continue having moderate success, including Pastoral, and Nito Mestre y Los Desconocidos de Siempre. But it was the beginning of the period of symphonic and progressive rock dominance.

1975−1983: The intermediate period

Progressive rock 

As early as 1973, the band Contraluz combined rock with progressive and folk tinges. They would be an influential group in the years leading to the rise of symphonic and Argentine progressive rock. Its albums were acclaimed nationally and by progressive rock fans worldwide.

Another symphonic/progressive band was Crucis. Their music began attracting attention in the underground, and so they started getting bigger performing venues. As change swept Argentine rock in 1975, their music was rapidly rising to popular musical tastes. Their compositions were strong and dynamic with unexpected breaks, and the interplay between the electric guitar and keyboards captivating. The rhythm-section sounded powerful and adventurous.

Espíritu, who formed in 1973 but had roots since 1969, would go on to be an internationally followed group in the latter part of symphonic rock's heyday. The first album Crisalida is cited as their best effort, with beautiful and alternating compositions and changing atmospheres (from mellow with acoustic guitar to up-tempo with heavy electric guitar), lush keyboards and some vocal harmonies.

Former heavy rockers El Reloj turned to prog with 1975's self-titled album. Their sound has been compared to Uriah Heep's mystic and proggy sound.

A symphonic band that would have a great year in 1976 was ALAS. Their music was even more intellectual and unorthodox. ALAS would feature artists such as Rodolfo Mederos and Pedro Aznar. Luis Alberto Spinetta would begin his third band Invisible later in that year. Their symphonic sound tinged with tango would bring critical praise. A band that showed a lot of promise that never materialised was Reino de Munt. Formed by Raul Porchetto, it featured a young Alejandro Lerner, and musicians like Gustavo Basterrica and Frank Ojsterseck.

Charly García formed his first post-Sui Generis band, La Máquina de Hacer Pájaros, which began Garcia's explorations of symphonic and progressive rock. Other symphonic and progressive bands of renown would be Torax, Ave Rock, Anacrusa, and Materia Gris.

Arco Iris meanwhile continued expanding on their symphonic-folk rock and were joined by veteran Chilean band Los Jaivas, whom were escaping the Pinochet dictatorship that had come to power in their nation in 1973. The two along with Contraluz were the main exponent of the subgenre.

On March 24, 1976, the democratic government was toppled by a military coup. It opened one of the darkest political chapters in Argentina's history, full of repression, fear, and missing citizens. Argentine rock by no means would be immune to the military crackdown, and would suffer the worst period of censorship in its history. Rock was seen as subversive by the nation's authority figures, who began to clamp down on the music. In a 1976 speech, Admiral Emilio Massera denounced rock musicians and fans as potential subversives and repression of them began in 1977. Before the end of the decade, rock had gone increasingly underground. Rock Nacional avoided the government's heavy media censorship and allowed an outlet for codified criticism of the government.

In spite of this however, the music would continue its development against the odds.  Along with the plethora of symphonic/progressive bands, heavies Vox Dei and Pappo's Blues continued to sustain their popularity during the period. Yet another heavy metal band, Plus, made their debut in '76 and enjoyed success through the end of the decade.

Symphonic rock at late 1970s 

Argentine rock continued its symphonic, so-called 'concert hall' sound through the end of the decade. The '78-'79 period was not the most prolific period for rock, as the progressive bands continued with their blueprint, and symphonic rock bands actually turned slightly commercial.

At the height of symphonic rock, Crucis was joined at the top by the popularity of Espíritu; the two are generally seen as the most well-known outfits of the symphonic rock period. The first album of La Máquina de Hacer Pájaros was a mixture of effort, individual performances, melodies, dynamic contrasts, ensemble work and arrangements.

1977 was a year of separation and endings: Crucis would disband at the end of the year. In heavy metal, Pappo's blues would see their nearly seven-year run end. Aquelarre would return from their Spanish stint, but following a tour run went their separate ways.

But the year would show a glimpse at the future: a band from La Plata called Patricio Rey y sus Redonditos de Ricota, with their comical costumes and nervy fast tempos, started performing. 1977 was a year in which certain bands had a short period of fame: Soluna (Gustavo Santaolalla's 2nd group), with their electric folk, and Orion's Beethoven, a progressive band that played since 1969 but had their moment of fame eight years later. Neither band sustained their popularity into 1978. Bubu with their album Anabelas, in 1978 was one of those bands too.

And even more bands ceased to be. After two successful albums that featured several would-be classics of the era, La Máquina de Hacer Pájaros hung up, as did Invisible, leaving as a legacy three albums: Invisible, Durazno Sangrando and Jardin de los Presentes. Pastoral, one of the last acoustic groups still successful, split by 1978, as did ALAS. With the country gripped by World Cup mania (Argentina was host in 1978), and the disco craze, rock music suffered the worst drought since its inception. The media was openly calling out 'the death' of Argentine rock.

Throughout the years, different figures and events helped Argentine rock to expand worldwide: Sandro y los del fuego in 1963; the Uruguayan Invasion of 1965 that proved the commercial viability of non-US or UK bands; the massive hit of "La balsa" by Los Gatos in '67 showing that Spanish language rock could be appealing to the masses; the Acusticazo of '72. In the drought days of 1978, Serú Girán emerged as a 'supergroup'.

Serú Girán 

In 1977 Charly García got together with his friend David Lebón, an ex member of Luis Alberto Spinetta's band Pescado Rabioso, to write songs in Brazil. There, Charly re-encountered Oscar Moro, the drummer of his former band "La Máquina De Hacer Pájaros" and they decided to invite him to help compose new material. The trio soon decided that instead of selling their songs like they had originally planned, they would play them themselves in a new band. Now all they needed was a bass player. Pedro Aznar was a lesser known bassist who had once been a member of progressive rock group "ALAS". He also happened to be a friend of Moro's, who knew of Aznar's ability with the funk and jazz bass. Moro brought Aznar into the group and they began to prepare themselves.

Charly, Moro, Lebón, and Aznar created a sound that was distinctive from anything in English-language rock. Their rock style caught the attention of both the lower and upper classes. Serú Girán could be 'brainy' yet unpretentious rockers simultaneously.

Partly because the group lived for three months in northeast Brazil, the band's first album shows clear influences of Brazilian music, mixed with symphonic rock and jazz. But the band's first live concert to support the album created one of the strangest anecdotes in Argentine rock: the fans did not understand the strange costumes the band used (entirely in white except for Garcia with a black jacket and shoes); and then when they played the song "Disco Shock", a satire poking fun at disco music (which was at its height in 1978), people thought they were really serious. Whistles and boos would follow and what should have been a great concert turned into a fiasco, with fans clamoring for Sui Generis songs. Serú Girán did not get their point across their ideas as expected. It would all fuel wild speculations about the members' sexual orientations, a PR nightmare at the time.

But the group bounced back with a vengeance with their 2nd album La Grasa de las Capitales. It was well received by the specialist press, and would cement their status as the most popular band of their time. Serú Girán's third album Bicicleta (1980) was tepidly received at first, but in time would be considered the band's best work. Both albums departed from the symphonic rock of the first LP, the music turning more visceral and 'simple' with less arrangement and pomp. Serú Girán would not be isolated in this trend, as slowly Argentine rock was writing the final chapters in its symphonic and progressive period.

Argentine rock and Falklands War 

The nation was still in the grip of a dictatorship as the 1980s dawned, even as repression had eased somewhat by then. The start of the decade continued to feature Serú Girán, now with their less pretentious sound, at the top of the charts. Vox Dei entered their 3rd decade in rock, a virtual first for any local band, and León Gieco's popularity as a solo artist was on the rise.

One of the last progressive bands would be Tantor. They were less symphonic and far more prog-experimental, with jazz as a major support. Their first eponymous album was a hit in the scene, and the band would continue till the mid-1980s as one of the last bands of the progressive era.

Serú Girán went touring in Brazil in 1980, where their reception by fans at the Monterrey Jazz Festival in Rio de Janeiro was so enjoyed that the organizers requested that they perform again, the next day, but on the main stage with jazz-rockers Weather Report. There, Pedro Aznar met Pat Metheny, to whom he gave some cassettes with his own works. Serú Girán returned home, released "Bicicleta" and gathered 60,000 fans in La Rural back in Buenos Aires chanting no se banca más (it isn't bearable anymore, alluding to the dictatorship). That year they had also performed in concert with Spinetta Jade, Luis Alberto Spinetta's latest project and the other popular rock group of the early 1980s. It was an event in which both bands eventually played some songs of each other's repertoire.

Spinetta Jade was a blend of jazz and rock that escaped the trappings of symphonic rock, something that was unheard in Argentina at that time. Towards the last two albums, the sound became a little bit more "pop", and embedded with electronic elements (samplers and synthesizers with "artificial" textures).

Serú Girán released their fourth album Peperina in 1981 and promoted it on tour, but by the end of the year Pedro Aznar decided to leave the band because he wanted to study at Berklee. (When he was there, by the end of 1982, he was called to join the Pat Metheny Group). Serú Girán (which at the time was even planning tours in Europe), had a strong sendoff on March 6–7, 1982, when they performed for the last time at the Arena Obras Sanitarias. They performed the song "No llores por mí, Argentina" ("Don't Cry for me, Argentina", which has no relation to the Evita musical theme), which was full of symbolism. It was not only a farewell for Aznar, and for Serú Girán, but for an era in Argentine music, and history. The timing was beyond befitting.

Argentina's economy was in full recession in 1982, and discontent with the military government was rampant. On April 2, the world would awake yet again in the 20th century to the horror of war. After a season of death and destruction in the South Atlantic in which both sides suffered sunken ships, aircraft blown from the sky, and hundreds of young lives were cut short, the United Kingdom regained control over the Falkland Islands (Islas Malvinas). The popularity of the Argentine military government hit then bottom, and democratic elections were called shortly after.

1983−1990: Argentine rock goes global

New Democracy Sound 

The war would be a dark chapter in Argentine history, but would have the paradoxical effect of creating one of the most fortuitous circumstances in the history of any rock genre.

In May of '82 the Festival for Latin American Solidarity brought together all the great bands of Argentine rock. It was a festival in support of the troops overseas, and also a veiled protest to war, and a call for peace (at first the musicians feared appearing for risk of being portrayed pro-war). This event was the final stepping stone of Argentine rock in becoming the dominant form of music in the country. At the same time, English-language rock was wiped out from radio play. The programmers had to fill the voids with something, and that was with Argentine rock. This created the opportunity of exposure to countless underground bands. It would set the foundations for the explosion of rock in the mid-1980s.

In the latter days of symphonic rock, a great number of new groups started popping
seemingly out of nowhere. In reality, these were bands influenced by post-punk, new wave from the US and Britain, and by the more symphonic and less progressive side of Argentine rock. Patricio Rey y sus Redonditos de Ricota, who had started in 1977, were growing a larger following on a monthly basis. In 1979 in La Plata, Federico Moura would form a pioneering  new wave band called Virus. In Buenos Aires, three young men influenced by the advent of post-punk in Britain started exchanging ideas, and decided to form a band with the name Soda Stereo.

In 1980 friends who were enthralled by the wave of US and UK punk formed the band Los Violadores. Miguel Abuelo, a founding figure of Argentine rock in the 1960s, would return after a decade in Europe and form Los Abuelos de la Nada, which happened to feature a young man by the name of Andres Calamaro. Someone named Miguel Mateos, after talking to Freddie Mercury, won the opportunity to open for Queen in Buenos Aires with his new band ZAS. At the local pubs in Mendoza a pop-rock act called Los Enanitos Verdes appeared. An Italian of Scottish background named Luca Prodan arrived in Argentina to fight his heroin addiction, worsened by the death of his friend Ian Curtis of Joy Division. Prodan would form Sumo. This band, one of the least conventional in Argentina at the time, and since, has been voted Best Argentine Band by a poll composed by rock journalists in 2009. Despite its 'underground' status, it has fervent followers in Chile, Uruguay, Mexico and a plethora of countries worldwide.

From the Festival of Latin American Solidarity emerged solo artists that would go on to delve into a more adult oriented form of rock and pop music, with the Argentine youngsters of the 1960s now mature adults. Some of these names were Juan Carlos Baglietto (who was optimistic about a young musician from Rosario named Fito Páez), Alejandro Lerner, and Celeste Carballo. In heavy metal, Pappo founded his new band Riff, and newcomers V8 and La Torre would emerge. New witty rock bands like Los Twist, Suéter, and the riot grrrl group Viuda e hijas de Roque Enroll crashed to the scene infusing Argentine rock with needed dosages of humor and self-deprecation. On the gothic side of rock, La Sobrecarga and Euroshima would carry the torch.

And for the first time in Argentine rock history there was a "revival" of an earlier style, with Acoustic rock making a comeback on the back of reunions by Almendra and Manal. On the other hand, Charly García and Luis Alberto Spinetta embarked on their solo careers. Moris returned from his period in Spain.

Meanwhile, Argentina entered a new era with the inauguration of Raúl Alfonsín as president of a fully democratic nation. Rock bands would no longer be harassed and even censored by the powers-that-be, and freedom of expression flowered. Songs critical of the military that were in prior years censored, some with exquisite lyrical poetry and allegory, were released during this time: "Tiempos Dificiles" by Fito Páez (sung by Juan Carlos Baglietto), "Maribel se Durmió" by Luis Alberto Spinetta, "Sólo le pido a Dios" by León Gieco and "Los dinosaurios" by Charly García. A more direct criticism of the military government that ended in 1983 came from the Argentine punk groups like Los Violadores (singing songs like "Represión") or seminal heavy metal bands like V8.

Finally, segments of Argentine rock moved away from the concert hall and 'solemn' era, full of very heavy lyrics and concerns with domestic issues. It started to lighten up and turn more irreverent, and to focus on mundane concerns such as money, love, and sports. This would make the music and lyrics far more accessible (and commercial) to international audiences.

The stage was set for the boom of Argentine rock in Latin America and beyond.

Argentine Invasion  

The Cafe Einstein was opened in 1982 by Omar Chaban (who would end up convicted for the República Cromañón nightclub fire 22 years later), featuring some of the first presentations of three underground bands: Sumo, Soda Stereo, and Los Twist. Both Sumo and Soda Stereo featured slightly different line-ups in their early days, with Sumo having an English girl, Stephanie Nuttal, on drums. She returned to England when war broke out between her country and Argentina. Also in '82 Charly García released his full-album solo debut, the acclaimed Yendo de la Cama al Living.

"One could feel the winds of change" in 1983 Argentina. A cliché perhaps, but at no time more appropriately used. Everything was optimism about the future, the country, and music. Even technology cooperated with the palpable change: it was the year the compact disc was introduced. And 1984 was the year of female rock: Patricia Sosa and her heavy rock band La Torre were voted best band of the year and "Solo quiero Rock and Roll" best single, a first for a female lead rock act. Another female-fronted band, Los Twist, and their superbly catchy tunes about nothing were also doing very well, but the group suffered a blow when Fabiana Cantilo left.

As the early 1980s progressed it became clear that the new generation of rockers were not like anything before: Los Violadores pioneering punk in Latin America; Virus oxygenating rock with their new-wave sound, followed by Cosméticos with a similar style; Sumo's punkish reggae-rock developing a fanatical cult following (Luca Prodan sung mostly in English, which reduced his band's radio exposure yet their fame expanded unabated); and Soda Stereo the buzz of the underground. ZAS introduced the phrase "rock en tu idioma" (rock in your language). Los Abuelos de la Nada and newcomers G.I.T. found quick success outside Argentina, a preview of things to come.

By 1985, year in which Los Fabulosos Cadillacs were formed, several bands began receiving consistent airplay across Latin America. Argentine rock began "climbing" the continent up the Andes: first Chile, then Peru, Ecuador, Colombia, Venezuela. Zeta Bosio member of Soda Stereo said regarding this: "We would leave Argentina and tour in Chile, Peru, etc, and in some places they had never heard a live rock concert before... they said that such music was for another world and wouldn’t work... now it's all joy seeing how it did work and that it now has its own legs..." Argentine rock bands were the first to be signed to multinational record labels for distribution across many nations.

The trickle became a flood as 1986 approached, and by the start of that year it had become a continental phenomenon, reaching Central America, Mexico, and crossing the Atlantic to Spain, even as far Italy, France, and Germany. Los Enanitos Verdes, with their energetic pop-rock that appealed through music lines, gained previously unseen popularity across borders. The Cadillacs, with their ska-rock with a heavy Latin infusion, turned into instant rock stars across Latin America and, eventually, worldwide. Rata Blanca, a heavy metal band formed in 1987 from the ashes of influential early 1980s rockers called V8, also conquered the Spanish-speaking world. The same did Charly García, Fito Páez, and now solo artist Miguel Mateos. 1986 was the climax of an unprecedented wave of international success for Argentine rock.

It would help to revitalize rock movements in other Latin American countries for two reasons: 1) It would create a buzz and excitement in the local rock scenes; 2) it proved to producers and record labels in those countries that "Rock en Español" could work and make them money. In Mexico, Argentine bands were being marketed by media giants like Televisa as "rock in your language". Its success changed the landscape of the Mexican scene: it laid the groundwork for Mexican rock in Spanish to itself expand overseas. In Peru, the Argentine invasion was a catalyst that brought that country's own movement more to the mainstream. In Chile, where a few outstanding bands existed even prior to the Argentine boom (see Los Prisioneros), the flood of rock music coming from their eastern neighbor would fully energize and inspire the local scene, and Argentine rock's influence continues to this day. The current boom in Colombian rock can be traced to the 1980s, with most Colombian rock acts citing the Argentine invasion groups as a direct influence. In countries like Paraguay, Uruguay, and Bolivia, the effects were even more profound.

As 1988 began, with the most important Argentine bands (Soda Stereo, Los Fabulosos Cadillacs, Los Enanitos Verdes, Rata Blanca, Charly García, Andres Calamaro, Miguel Mateos, Sumo, Virus) on constant tour of Latin America, Europe, and even countries in Asia, the globalization of Argentine rock and pop was complete. By this time the invasion had begun to 'quiet' down in comparison to the prior three years, but its legacy of opening the doors of Argentine rock to massive success beyond its own borders remains to this day.

Soda Stereo 

Soda Stereo was one of the most successful and influential rock band in Spanish ever. The influence of Soda Stereo and its music, style, and even 'business acumen' is undeniable. They were also the first Spanish-language band to use all aspects of their popularity to the fullest: their music videos, aesthetic, philosophy, and more. In the beginning they were deeply influenced by new wave and bands such as The Police, Television, and Talking Heads, and by symphonic rockers Luis Alberto Spinetta and Aquelarre.

With their first album, the self-titled Soda Stereo (1984), they reached national success with joyful and ironic lyrics, and a sound that combined pop, reggae, ska, and new wave, but were accused of being superficial and frivolous. The second album, Nada Personal, strengthened the popularity of the band, with instant classics such as "Nada Personal" and "Cuando Pase el Temblor" opening the doors of the Latin American market; 1986's "Signos" would heavily increase their popularity and in 1988 they came up with what could arguably be called their masterpiece, their album "Doble Vida". The musical arrangements and the lyrics reached a subtlety never heard before from the band's production, the most notable example being the album's lead single "En La Ciudad De La Furia", a cryptically metaphorical ode to the band's hometown of Buenos Aires and the city's inhabitants. They embarked in an extensive tour through Latin America that brought the live album Ruido Blanco.

With the tour supporting Signos, Soda Stereo became international superstars. The band would continue their worldwide success well into the 1990s, and evolving their musical sounds unlike almost any other Rock en Español band. In fact, they would lead the way in the changes Argentine rock would experience as the 1990s drew near.

Late '80s: Loss and Experimentation 

The year 1987 ended in tragedy for Argentine rock. Luca Prodan had finally lost his personal battle with alcohol and was found dead on December 22, due to complications from his addiction. His death was a shock to the entire music industry and to millions of heartbroken fans. Following Prodan's death, the members of Sumo split, founding two new rock outfits: Divididos and Las Pelotas; both bands became major players of 1990s rock.

Miguel Abuelo, following gallbladder surgery, was diagnosed with AIDS; terminally ill, he died from cardiac arrest on March 26, 1988. Virus leader Federico Moura's persistent pneumonia fueled rumors of further complications, which ended in the revelation soon after by the singer that he was infected with AIDS. Moura died on December 21, 1988. Moura's passing completed a dreadful trifecta of musicians who had still much to offer. It was a tough blow for rock. As a group, Virus survived and soldiered on into the 1990s as a more adult pop-rock outfit than the outrageous yet influential 1980s band that helped define the sound of "techno-pop".

Three major trends defined the Argentine rock of the end of the 1980s. The first trend was the consolidation of the Argentine Invasion bands into somewhat more mature rock groups. Some began to experiment with world music in the last two years of the 1980s. For example, Charly García got together with his old Serú Girán partner Pedro Aznar and recorded "Tango", whose name accurately suggests the style of the album. Before Federico Moura's death, Virus had also begun turning to Brazilian music for their album Superficies de Placer. In general the mood of the music got darker echoing a deteriorated economic climate.

A second was the rise of "Tropical" rock, and the explosion of local Reggae bands in Argentina seemingly out of nowhere in 1987. While Argentine rock was triumphant internationally, Argentina was caught in a reggae-mania: in the summer of that year arose Los Pericos, Los Cafres, La Zimbabwe, and Jafran, among many other smaller outfits. But it was a fad, and only Los Pericos would sustain and grow their careers once the fancy faded (Los Cafres would be mildly successful starting in 1994).
A band that was not a fad was Los Auténticos Decadentes, who would become a hugely popular ska-Latin pop and ballad group. They along with Los Pericos and Los Fabulosos Cadillacs would be leaders in the tropical rock scene of ska, reggae and Latin music.

The third trend came about partly as a result of the first: many rock fans did not approve of the commercialism and experimentation of the A-bands, and increasingly looked underground for a more confrontational guitar-led rock. Among them: Todos Tus Muertos, Don Cornelio y La Zona (later Los Visitantes), Los Brujos, Babasónicos, Los Siete Delfines, Massacre Palestina. All of them would be part of the "Nuevo Rock" ("New Rock") explosion of the early 1990s.

In heavy metal, the already mentioned Rata Blanca dominated popular tastes, specially in other Latin American countries, along with Hermética, JAF, and Horcas (the last two more domestic), in a very healthy scene for a style that never was overwhelmingly crowded in Argentine rock. An important band in the metal underground was Nepal, one of the pioneering bands of thrash metal. Formed in 1984, they were part of the first generation of worldwide thrashers, and gained prominence as the decade ended and musical tastes turned approbatory for more extreme metal. The genre got many magazines committed solely to it and distributed nationwide: Madhouse, Metal, Riff Raff, Revista Epopeya, etc.

The end of the 1980s were also a period of continued growth for Patricio Rey y sus Redonditos de Ricota, on their way to becoming one of the most mythic cult bands of broad popularity in the history of rock, anywhere. It was also the time when Los Ratones Paranoicos were gaining followers with the burgeoning "rolingas" (followers of a subgenre of Argentine rock that is greatly indebted to the Rolling Stones). On the pop side Man Ray with their tailor-made FM songs were ubiquitous. Finally, Divididos and their guitar-crunching melodic noise was more and more becoming a preview of what the next decade would bring. In general, as the fantastic 1980s for Argentine rock closed, the music was in period of transition and exploration at all levels.

1990−1998: Modern Argentine Rock

"Canción Animal" and New Rock 

Soda Stereo's frontman Gustavo Cerati could foresee the musical trends, putting his own band in front of it. After releasing the increasingly hard rocking Doble Vida, the band headed to studio with new producer Daniel Melero to record their fifth album, Canción Animal. It was released in October 1990, about a year before Nirvana released Nevermind.

Canción Animal confirmed that it was OK to return Argentine rock to an 'in your face', edgy attitude that shaped the Argentine Invasion aesthetic in the early years of the 1980s, but this time with electric guitars as the stars.  From that album, the single "De Música Ligera", might well be the most recognizable Spanish-language rock single of all time, and also one of the most covered by bands all over Latin America and elsewhere. Canción Animal helped underground acts like Los Brujos, Peligrosos Gorriones, and Massacre break faster into the mainstream, by taking guitar-crunching rock to the apex as 1991 began. Even pop-bound groups like Los Enanitos Verdes rocked harder in their early 1990s works, particularly in their Big Bang album, whose single "Lamento Boliviano" is now a classic.

These and other bands in their wake would be dubbed the "Nuevo Rock Argentino", or New Argentine Rock. A term that not long after would also be used as an umbrella to group bands with a hard-to-pin-down style, like the neo-surf pop of Super Ratones (from Mar del Plata), and neo-fusionists La Portuaria with their world music touches. "Nuevo Rock" would be the dominant form of rock in Argentina until the middle of the decade when it lost ground to so-called "rock suburbano".

In 1992, Soda Stereo presented Dynamo, their sixth album, arguably the most conceptual (the other being "Signos"), and the most experimental to that point. It apparently took fans by surprise, and was the lowest seller of the group's works (it didn't help that in the middle of all this the band changed labels; Sony wouldn’t promote a band that was leaving, and BMG wouldn't promote another label's album).

On the other hand, Babasónicos had in 1992 their first major breakthrough of their careers with the hit D-generación from their 1992 album Pasto, which would herald future international success for a band that would define the sound of "sonic" rock. Juana La Loca was another band in the so-called sonic scene that started in the early 1990s and would breakthrough a few years later. The band that founded the Sonic Movement in Buenos Aires was Iguana Lovers, started in 1990. Now with collaborations of the shoegaze British indie Ride members, Mark Gardener and Loz Colbert, they were positioned as the most important new band of the Buenos Aires indie scene in 1991. Los Brujos would have a great year 1992; the single "Kanishka" was an instant chart-topper. Los Visitantes equalled the success of Los Brujos the next year with their album Salud Universal, an offbeat mix of guitar rock and tango tinges. Todos Tus Muertos was a punk response to the Argentine rock being made in the late 1980s, consciously choosing to be far more direct and explicit in their musical (and political) statements. The band gained rapid acclaim with the rise of New Rock, and were one of the favorite bands of the period. Slowly the group would evolve from their early punk to a more diverse style that include afro-Latin rhythms.

The odd-group out that appeared in the early 1990s was the outrageously named Illya Kuryaki and the Valderramas (a reference to Colombian footballer Carlos Valderrama). More rappers than rockers, the group nonetheless made a mark in the rock scene as time progressed and they were able to more successfully integrate rap with Argentine rock, and also Latin rhythms. One of the members, Dante, is the son of Luis Alberto Spinetta.

Rock rolinga 

As New Rock was dominant, some acts in the distant suburbs of Buenos Aires where playing straightforward and guitar centered rock music, with a foundation in the blues, and an unsophisticated image (somewhat a counter-movement to the image conscious, musically more pretentious New Rock).

Some of these suburban acts owed so much to the sound of the Rolling Stones, that their followers came to be known as "rolingas". Eventually the rock rolinga (a.k.a. rock stone) became a style: cheesy 1970s sneakers, tight T-shirts with the logo of the Stones or a local 'stone' band, and a disdain for other Argentine rock subgenres they consider part of the establishment. At the forefront of this movement were Los Ratones Paranoicos, whom for years before were perfecting a musical formula that would be emulated by countless neighborhood bands in years to come. They were joined in the Rolinga scene by Viejas Locas in the mid 1990s.

The incessant touring of the rolinga bands around the suburbs of Buenos Aires and other cities would reap benefits not only for themselves but for other suburban groups that would follow soon after. Thus, Rolinga rock arguably became the most popular music genre in Argentina in the 1990s.

1990s Metal
The last decade of the twentieth century was a very productive one for this style of rock in Argentina. There had always been "heavy" bands: Billy Bond y la Pesada del Rock in the 1960s, Pescado Rabioso and Pappo's Blues in the 1970s, V8, Riff (Argentine band), and several underground metal acts in the 1980s. But they had never been at the forefront of Argentine rock, seemingly always obscured by other genres whether it was acoustic, symphonic, progressive, or the 1980s invasion bands. This changed in the 1990s.

As the decade started Rata Blanca, Horcas, Hermética and J.A.F had very respectable careers. Rata Blanca was internationally approved: in fact, it is plausible to state that their classic metal sound was more popular outside Argentina than within. Internationally popular to a lesser extent was Hermética, the arch-rivals of Rata Blanca (both formed in 1987 when V8 disbanded), but there were no doubts of their massive following at home. Horcas and J.A.F stayed mostly successful in the local medium, though nonetheless had some overseas exposure.

The major development in Argentine metal of the 1990s was the rise of A.N.I.M.A.L. The acronym translated literally stands for "Abused (accosted), Our Indians Died While Fighting". And their themes lived up to that title: the band would be one of the most outspoken advocates for indigenous people and even nationalism, while also (as such bands tend to do), blasting against the current world order. Their sound is equal parts hardcore, heavy metal, and thrash. Another important band formed in 1990 was Tren Loco, whom long after went to Japan and won second place in a major battle-of-the-band event at famous Budokan Stadium in Tokyo. The metal underground also flourished in the 1990s, with bands like Alakrán, Jezabel, Jason, Logos, and Jeriko, among others.

Other developments

Solo artists from the earlier generations were by the 1990s established figures in the medium. Some stars were Charly García and Luis Alberto Spinetta. Garcia enjoyed a prolific 1980s with many of his albums turning into classics. Spinetta had a more uneven body of work but nonetheless was successful. Pappo continued putting out blues and heavy rock records, Miguel Mateos remained a popular rock figure in Latin America even as he dropped almost off the radar in Argentina. León Gieco's unique "folk-rock meets world music" approaches made him an internationally acclaimed musician.

Fito Páez's pop career continued to take-off in the early 1990s. In 1992 he released El Amor después del Amor, becoming the best selling Argentine rock album. The title "love after love" was not by chance: he had just ended a well-publicized relationship with female rocker Fabiana Cantilo (herself an important 1990s singer in the movement), and was getting involved with movie actress Cecilia Roth. With the album Paez was confirmed an international pop star. Meanwhile, Andrés Calamaro had enjoyed some popularity since his solo career begun, but never managed a complete breakthrough with the public. He left for Spain, and there met two local musicians forming Los Rodriguez in 1991. Two years later the hit single "Sin Documentos" finally gave Calamaro an international hit, and the band gained overnight vogue in Spain and Latin America.

Tropical, Fusion, and Latin influenced rock continued its ascent. 1992 was the year of "La Pachanga": Rosario's Vilma Palma e Vampiros single was an across the board mega hit in the Spanish-speaking world; there was no way of escaping it unless one did not have any kind of social life in the early 1990s.
Bands like Los Auténticos Decadentes, who had a major hit in 1990 with "Loco (tu forma de ser)", and Los Pericos mirrored the tendency of increased popularity for the subgenre. Los Fabulosos Cadillacs had a slump in the early 1990s after harvesting great accolades in the late 1980s, but came back with a roar in 1994 with Vasos Vacios; the compilation that featured "Matador". The single would turn into a global superhit, winning MTV's best video of the year. The early 1990s were also the formative years of a group that would have an impact towards the new millennium: Bersuit Vergarabat. La Mosca would begin tapping into the tropical and Latin trend by 1995.

Argentine punk-revival took off in the 1990s. Los Violadores had ruled 1980s punk; them along with the foreign punk bands of yesteryear would inspire the members of Attaque 77 and Flema. Formed in 1986 and 1987 respectively, they were pioneers of the worldwide punk revival movement. Attaque 77's breakthrough came in 1990 with the single "Hacelo por Mi"; Flema never broke to the mainstream but were heroic figures of the punk underground. Both groups paved the way for dozens of followers. One of those were 2 Minutos, with their pure-energy, extreme, back-to-basics punk rock. Another darling of the scene were Todos Tus Muertos, perhaps one of few bands in any punk movement that was accepted for their various rock styles besides punk. Fun People took punk's liberal philosophy to another level by tackling the punk-scene itself: many of their lyrics criticized the macho attitudes in the movement which they saw contradictory to the spirit of punk. They were also the first band that sang in Spanglish, meanwhile another bands, like Drop Dead! Argentina used to do it only in English. The She Devils were the leaders of the local queercore scene. Cienfuegos, a punk band that had existed since the 1980s but suffered various contingencies, finally would produce albums by the mid 1990s.

See: Argentine punk

In the Argentine northwest, important punk and indie scenes developed in the mid-to-late nineties. Bands like 448, Volstead, Estacion Experimental and Los Chicles led the scenes.

The Mid '90s Schism 

In the middle years of the 1990s a rift developed in Argentine rock that would, with only slight wrinkles, endure to present times.

By 1995 "nuevo rock argentino" or Argentine new rock had lost steam. For starters, bands like Los Siete Delfines and Peligrosos Gorriones, with their more artistic antics, fell out of favor. At the same time, groups like Massacre and La Portuaria went on recording hiatuses and would not return until more favorable winds in the early to mid-2000s. Los Brujos disbanded in 1998 after eight years of solid productions, but it left a large void in the movement. One of the last hurrahs of new rock were rap-rockers Actitud Maria Marta, which had a year of fame in 1995. Babasónicos, Todos Tus Muertos, and Illya Kuryaki and the Valderramas were some of the new rock bands that were able to maintain their level as the year 2000 approached.

Also, 1995 would see the last album by Soda Stereo, their relaxed almost chillout-like Sueño Stereo, an album at times more electronic than rock previewing the direction of Gustavo Cerati's solo career. Soda Stereo would go on a last grand tour through the United States and Latin America, selling out entire stadiums as they went.  Their last concert in Buenos Aires in 1997 was released as a double-album, with 70,000 people selling out twice at the Estadio Monumental Antonio Vespucio Liberti. The arguably greatest band in Argentine and Rock en Español history wrapped up the concert and their career with the live version of "De Musica Ligera";, Gustavo Cerati, the vocalist, guitarist and leader of the band, would end the song thanking his public, and would finish this gratitude by saying "... Gracias totales" (total thanks), this would become an iconic phrase for the band and Argentine rock thereafter.

Conversely, "rolinga" rock was on the up. On the one hand were the 1980s bands that by the mid 1990s approached the suburban rock sound: Redonditos de Ricota, Divididos, Las Pelotas. They were joined by two bands that would define suburban in the late 1990s as well: Los Piojos and La Renga. La Renga is also considered one of the Rolinga groups (followers of the Rolling Stones blueprint) like Los Ratones Paranoicos and Viejas Locas, whose weighty followings would only grow larger.

Argentine youth began to musically and socially gravitate to either the suburban rock groups or towards the underground. And even within these two major groupings there were subdivisions (rolinga and post-chabón in suburban rock; sonico, punk, dark in the underground). Then there were the heavy metal followers, the large and expanding indie scene, and the tropical rock followers, genre increasingly intermixed with the fledgling Cumbia which would explode in the new millennium. The pieces were in place for the current period of rock in Argentina.
On a completely different, and original level, Andrea Prodan (Luca Prodan's brother) emerged with a bizarre and unique all-vocal, solo album called Viva Voce, recorded on independent label Silly Records. The record won an A.C.E. award and was among Peter Gabriel's favourite records in his Real World list of 1996.

1998− : The Contemporary Period

Late 1990s & 21st century 

The late 1990s charts were dominated by the success of bands like Los Piojos, La Renga, Divididos, Redonditos de Ricota, Las Pelotas, Los Ratones Paranoicos, La Mancha de Rolando, Caballeros de la Quema, and many more suburban rock bands. They were joined by Uruguayans No Te Va Gustar and La Vela Puerca, giving rise to the term "rioplatense" rock (rock from the Río de la Plata region) to label all of the similarly inclined outfits. Rolinga rock has created many fine singles and albums, but critics argue many of the bands (specially second rate groups in the rolinga scene), simply repeated the same formula to sell albums. Another feature of rolinga rock is that it tends to shun overseas success: whether this is a conscious attitude or a simple limitation of the genre is an ongoing debate.

On the other hand, the likes of Divididos, Los Piojos, and Redonditos have transcended its constraints and become influential in Argentine rock and popular on an international level. The better bands in the genre also feature an unusual versatility with non-rock styles like tango, folk, African music, Latin, jazz, and even North American country music, each with their own eclectic mixture. It would help elevate them from the legions of imitators in the crowded suburban scene. Divididos 6th album "Narigon Del Siglo" (2000) was one of the first great Argentine rock albums of the new decade; it was peppered with folk.

The underground was more under than usual in the late 1990s, it was nonetheless extremely creative. A style that gained some mainstream exposure was "rock sónico" ("sonic" rock), influenced by the 1980s "techno-pop" of Virus and early Soda Stereo (and also Britpop), through Babasónicos and Juana La Loca. The latter group found success with sonic rock in 1997's Vida Modelo. The former would increase their popularity with each new album, arriving at 2001's Jessico, which received international acclaim as one of the first truly outstanding albums of the new millennium. Other underground groups started making noise at this time: Iguana Lovers, they founded the Sonic movement in Buenos Aires in 1990, El Otro Yo, Catupecu Machu, and Santos Inocentes, leaders-to-be of the early 2000s alternative rock scene in Argentina. Super Ratones's returned to the alternative charts with 2001's Grammy nominee Mancha Registrada.

In heavy metal, Hermética disbanded by 1995 giving rise to Almafuerte. With a more up-to-date sound, they were one of the late 1990s favorites along with A.N.I.M.A.L. Rata Blanca continued to perform and record intermittently touring countries around Latin America. Classic metalists O'Connor in the underground would emerge by the early 2000s, along with exponents of nu metal Cabezones and Carajo. One of the most critically acclaimed bands of present is Los Natas. Originally a stoner rock group, in subsequent albums the band has turned more experimental. Some have called this demiurgic style (infused with Argentine folk, psychedelia, and space rock) "Patagonian doom", and this brand of metal has been ranked with the best heard in the new millennium.  The band itself prefers to call it "free" rock.

In punk, Attaque 77 were still going strong, as did Fun People (including a European tour), until their disbanding in 2000. The punk underground of the late 1990s was buzzing with new bands (Cadena Perpetua, Expulsados), many of them to guide the early 2000s melodic punk scene (Smitten (band), Shaila).

In tropical or fusion rock, Bersuit Vergarabat rose to the zenith of the genre. Libertinaje (1998) catapulted the band to the top, and to tours of the Americas and Europe. The follow-up Hijos del Culo (2000) also went double-platinum. Both albums display a dizzying range in style versatility. From the side of reggae-rock Los Pericos and Los Cafres dominated. Ska had Los Calzones and Kapanga, but by 2000 Los Fabulosos Cadillacs had called it quits to their internationally renowned career of rock with ska, rap, reggae, and Latin. La Mosca and Dancing Mood reached achieved greater popularity. Illya Kuryaki and the Valderramas produced some catchy, original, and danceable music (a mix of rock, hip-hop, and Latin) which cemented their fan base all over the Americas, until the duo's separation in 2001.

A highly talented and promising band was Karamelo Santo, another contribution of the city of Mendoza (also home of Los Enanitos Verdes). They featured a very refreshing mix of rock, punk, ska, afro-Uruguayan, and cumbia rhythms that earned them critical praise in Argentina. They would spend most of the 2001–2004 period on extensive tours of Europe and the Americas. Todos Tus Muertos would break up at the height of their popularity in 1999.

To a lesser extent dance and electronica music, which in Argentina have the largest scenes in Latin America, also influenced Argentine rock of the 2000s. A good example of this is the internationally prominent techno-pop act Miranda!, a band that owes as much to current dance and electronica as the 1980s techno-pop of Virus and Los Encargados, electronic pioneers in Argentina.

Nowadays 

Argentine rock, in the middle of the 2000s, can be said to showcase the following trends:

 A continued commercial success of rolinga and suburban rock. In the early part of the current decade the so-called '2nd wave of suburban' crashed to the scene: Guasones, Jovenes Pordioseros, La 25, Cielo Razzo, Black Roses, Hijos Del Oeste, El Bordo, Callejeros and Casi Justicia Social. Their fan base is somewhat younger than those of the 1st wave, and their music is derivative of the 1st but with a slightly pop, more teen oriented approach.
 Influenced by bands like Genesis, Pink Floyd, Porcupine Tree, Rush and Dream Theater the underground progressive rock and progressive metal scene has been constantly growing since 2005, with many trends like: metal - influenced bands like Fughu, Dudosa Moral and Destino 101, progressive - pop - metal like De Rien, jazz fusion - progressive rock outfit Fantasía Cromática, progressive - folk Isósceles, King Crimson - Frank Zappa influenced Souls Ignite and symphonic rock–art rock Rodrigo San Martín and Maybe.
 The current punk scene in Argentina features no real mainstream bands (besides eternal punks Attaque 77), and an underground scene with different groups. Some of them include Smitten (band); Cadena Perpetua with their well-crafted and tight songs; Romapagana certainly unusual and inspiring with their cosmopolitan mix of language and dynamic sound;Shaila who also features many English lyric songs, unusual for Argentine rock; and veterans 2 Minutos who soldier on.
 Heavy Metal at mid decade features a predominance of nu-metal and doom metal groups; Carajo, Cabezones and a recharged A.N.I.M.A.L. in the former (and all having toured extensively overseas), internationally acclaimed doomsters Los Natas, and Lörihen for the latter. O'Connor is one of the classic metal revivalists. Under AC/DC's influence, La Naranja Metalica consolidated its career.
 In fusion or tropical rock Bersuit Vergarabat still command legions. Dancing Mood is the ska representative on the mainstream, and Nonpalidece is the current reggae-rock band in vogue. Other current bands include Karamelo Santo, Los Calzones, La Mosca Tsé - Tsé, and Kapanga. Ex-Los Fabulosos Cadillacs Vicentico and ex-Todos Tus Muertos Fidel Nadal are both well embarked in their solo careers with fusion rock.
 In alternative, El Otro Yo continue their impressive streak of great albums and fresh sounding music. Catupecu Machu's slightly threatening rock has made them a mainstream alternative band, and Babasónicos are arguably the most internationally popular Argentine band today. La Portuaria, after a late 1990s hiatus in a hostile musical climate, returned in the early 2000s as alternative once again resurfaced in Argentina.
 A renovated indie scene with great bands like Jaime Sin Tierra, which created lush beautiful rock before disbanding in 2001 leaving behind the seed for the sound of bands like Las Curvas de Mondrián, 1000 NICKS with their retro rock style, Dalmanerea with their original and creative "meZKla argentina" and Interama and their left-of-the-dial melodies. Entre Rios's elegant electro lounge with female vocals is one of the best kept secrets in Argentina's indie scene. The indie scene also has a neo-symphonic revival scene with the likes of Pez and A Tirador Laser, bands which are reviving the sound of later 1970s Argentine rock with an updated resonance.
 In addition there is a large indie scene influenced by Krautrock and late 1980s/early 1990s British and American indie-rock acts such as The Pastels, The Vaselines, Jesus and Mary Chain and My Bloody Valentine. Some of the most popular bands from this scene include Iguana Lovers (that's started in 1990 with collaborations of Ride (band) members, Mark Gardener and Loz Colbert and the Scottish band The Jesus and Mary Chain), El Mato a un Policia Motorizado and Banda de Turistas. Some Argentinean lesser-known bands influenced by late 1980s/early 1990s British and American indie-rock artists are Fun People (Buenos Aires), Sir Hope (Córdoba) and Esto No Es Londres (Córdoba).
 The start of the 2nd generation of Argentine rock solo artists formerly members of great bands of their era: Gustavo Cerati, Indio Solari, Vicentico, Fidel Nadal, etc. Ex-Soda Stereo member Cerati spent most of the early part of the decade in the electronic side of music. In 2006 he returned with his first album of all new music since 2002 (Ahi Vamos) where rock was front and center, albeit a more mature rock of a man in the middle age of his life. Ex-Patricio Rey y sus Redonditos de Ricota Solari's debut album El tesoro de los Inocentes was seen as the best of 2004. Vicentico and his homonymous debut sold well, but his second effort suffered the sophomore slump. He has just released his third solo album, Los Pájaros. Skay Beillinson, also ex-Redonditos, also did well with his fourth solo efforts.
 Many new bands influenced by Redonditos de Ricota are reaching recognition. Those include Mavirock, and Cajale Cazazo.
 The politics of grassroots feminism has had an important influence on Argentine rock artists and on the rock music scene.  In 2019, the Congress passed a gender equity law requiring at least 30% of musical festival lineups be women artists. Notable feminist rockers include Marilina Bertoldi, Flopa, Marina Fages, Cam Beszkin, Mujeres Bacanas, Loli Molina, Los Besos, Rosario Bléfari, Lara Pedrosa, ibiza pareo, Sol Bassa, Potra, Florencia Ruiz, Eruca Sativa (band), and  Miss Bolivia.
 The first decade of this century saw the apparition of rock bands singing in English, like Watchmen (not to be confused with The Watchmen, the Canadian band), or the Anglo-Argentine The Draytones. Skiltron, playing Celtic metal, released his first album in 2006. Skiltron split in 2011, giving origin to Triddana. Another Celtic metal is Tersivel (2004), whose first EP was recorded in 2006 and their first full-length album was released in 2010. Other notable English singing bands are Electronomicón (hard rock), Kapel Maister (symphonic metal), 42 decibel  (hard rock), Maxi Trusso, Full Nothing, Siamés and Octafonic.

References

External links 
Database on Argentine rock artists, songs and albums
Rock News, Concerts and More
Going Underground: New music from Argentina Article looking at some of Argentina's underground rock and indie bands

20th-century music genres
 
Music
Latin American music

Rock music by country